Linda Faye Nazar   is a Senior Canada Research Chair in Solid State Materials and Distinguished Research Professor of Chemistry at the University of Waterloo. She develops materials for electrochemical energy storage and conversion. Nazar demonstrated that interwoven composites could be used to improve the energy density of lithium–sulphur batteries. She was awarded the 2019 Chemical Institute of Canada Medal.

Early life and education 
Nazar studied chemistry at the University of British Columbia, where she earned a bachelor's degree in 1978. She was inspired to study chemistry after being inspired by her first year professor. Her father had trained as a scientist and ran his own jewellery making business. Nazar joined the University of Toronto for her graduate studies, and completed a PhD under the supervision of Geoffrey Ozin in 1984. After obtaining her degree, she worked as a postdoctoral researcher working with Allan Jacobson at Exxon Research and Engineering Company, before joining the University of Waterloo in the late 1980s, when she became interested in electrochemistry and Inorganic chemistry.

Research and career 
Nazar works in materials chemistry at the University of Waterloo, where she designs energy storage devices and electrochemical systems. Her research group create new materials and nanostructures for lithium–sulfur batteries, including interwoven composites. She develops structural probes to understand how the morphology of materials that are capable of charge/ ionic redox processes impact their functions. These techniques include nuclear magnetic resonance (NMR), electrochemistry, AC Impedance Spectroscopy and X-ray diffraction measurements. Nazar was a founding member of the Waterloo Institute for Nanotechnology. Nazar is recognised as being a "leading authority in advanced materials". She was awarded a Canada Research Chair in 2004, which was renewed in 2008 and 2012. In 2009 Nazar joined the California Institute of Technology as a More Distinguished Scholar. In 2013 she was awarded a $1.8 million fellowship from the National Research Council to investigate energy storage materials for automotive applications.

Nazar is particularly interested in storage materials that go beyond lithium-ion batteries, sodium-ion batteries, zinc ion batteries and magnesium-ion batteries. Lithium-ion batteries are the battery of choice in hybrid electric vehicles, but concerns have arisen about the global supply of lithium. Her early work developed porous carbon architectures as frameworks for cathodes, enhancing their conductivity and discharge capacity. She demonstrated that interwoven carbon composites could be used to improve the energy density of lithium–sulphur batteries. She showed it was possible to create mesoporous carbon frameworks that constrain the grown of sulphur nanofillers, which improved energy storage and reversibility.

Nazar calculated the low-cost lithium–sulphur batteries could take electric cars twice as far as current lithium-ion technologies. Sulphur is an abundant material that can be used to replace cobalt oxide in lithium-ion batteries. Unfortunately, sulphur can dissolve into the electrolyte solution, and be reduced by electrons to form polysulphides. They are also susceptible to high internal resistance and capacity fading on cycling. These challenges can be overcome by creating nanostructures in the electrodes. Interwoven composites can also be made from manganese dioxide, which stabilise polysuplphides in lithium–sulphur batteries. Manganese dioxide reduces sulphides via a surface-bound polythiosulphanates, and can withstand 2,000 discharge cycles without the loss of capacitance. She has also developed lithium oxygen batteries, which are lightweight with high energy density. In lithium oxygen batteries, superoxide and peroxide can act to degrade the cells; limiting their lifetime. If the electrolyte is replaced with a molten salt and the porous cathode with a bifunctional metal oxide, the peroxide does not form. Nazar has worked on supercapacitors and polyanion materials.

She was made a Professor at the University of Waterloo in 2016 and holds a Tier 1 Canada Research Chair in Solid State Energy Materials. Since 2014 Nazar has served on the board of directors of the International Meeting on Li-Batteries. She serves on the editorial boards of the journals Angewandte Chemie, Energy & Environmental Science and the Journal of Materials Chemistry A.

Awards and honours 
Her awards and honours include;

 1978 Royal Society of Chemistry Undergraduate Award
 2010 Canadian Society for Chemistry Rio Tinto Alcan Award for Electrochemistry
 2011 International Battery Association Award
 2011 Royal Society of Canada Fellowship
 2012 International Union of Pure and Applied Chemistry Distinguished Women in Chemistry
 2013 Society of German Chemists August-Wilhelm-von-Hofmann Lectureship
 2014 Web of Science Most Highly Cited Researchers
 2014 Thomson Reuters World's Most Influential Scientific Minds
 2015 Officer of the Order of Canada
 2017 University of Waterloo Outstanding Performance Award
 2018 Thomson Reuters Most Highly Cited Researchers
 2019 Chemical Institute of Canada Medal
2020 Elected Fellow of the Royal Society

Patents 
Nazar's patents include;

 2002 New electrode materials for a rechargeable electrochemical cell
 2007 Mixed Lithium/Sodium Ion Iron Fluorophosphate Cathodes for Lithium Ion Batteries
 2009 Sulfur-carbon material
 2011 Multicomponent electrodes for rechargeable batteries
 2014 Composites comprising mxenes for cathodes of lithium sulphur cells
 2015 Electrode materials for rechargeable zinc cells and batteries produced therefrom

References 

Canadian women academics
Canadian women chemists
University of British Columbia alumni
University of Toronto alumni
Academic staff of the University of Waterloo
Year of birth missing (living people)
Living people
Officers of the Order of Canada
Fellows of the Royal Society of Canada
Canada Research Chairs
Female Fellows of the Royal Society
20th-century Canadian chemists
20th-century Canadian women scientists
21st-century Canadian chemists
21st-century Canadian women scientists
Canadian Fellows of the Royal Society
Solid state chemists